Guy Weill (May 13, 1914 – August 17, 2006) was a Swiss-born American art collector. Born in Switzerland, he served in military intelligence for the United States Army during World War II and ran a luxury clothing store on Madison Avenue after the war. He was a large collector of Abstract Expressionism, Neo-Expressionism, and Asian Art.

Early life
Guy Weill was born circa 1914 in Zurich, Switzerland. His mother was Alsatian. He had a sister, Marianne Lester. His cousin, Kurt Weill, was a renowned composer.

Weill emigrated to the United States in 1938. During World War II, he worked in military intelligence for the United States Army.

Career
Weill ran a clothing store on Madison Avenue in New York City called British American House. He imported luxury clothes from England, like Aquascutum and Burberry, and sold them in his store.

Art collection
Weill began collecting paintings by Pablo Picasso and Ernst Ludwig Kirchner as a teenager in Switzerland. Once in New York after World War II, he and his wife focused on collecting works of Abstract Expressionism and Neo-Expressionism. For example, they acquired paintings by Sam Francis, Philip Guston, Robert Motherwell, Larry Rivers, Karel Appel, Helen Frankenthaler and Louise Nevelson.

From the late 1970s onward, Weill and his wife began collecting Asian art. In 1979, they began an annual trip on the Silk Road of China to find more art to purchase.

In 2002, the Weills's art collection was the subject of an exhibition at the Metropolitan Museum of Art called Cultivated Landscapes: Reflections of Nature in Chinese Painting with Selections from the Collection of Marie-Hélène and Guy Weill. A catalogue was subsequently published.

Personal life and death
Weill had a wife, Marie-Hélène Bigar, and three daughters, Photographer Kathryn, Film and TV Director Claudia and Patricia. They resided in New York City and summered in Cape Cod. He died on August 17, 2006, at the age of 92.

References

External links
Christie's: The Weills — ‘A collaboration of like minds’ on YouTube

1914 births
2006 deaths
People from Zürich
People from New York City
Swiss emigrants to the United States
Swiss art collectors
American art collectors